The 1986 Norwegian Football Cup was the 81st edition of the Norwegian annual knockout football tournament. The Cup was won by Tromsø after they beat Lillestrøm in the cup final with the score 4–1. This was Tromsø's first Norwegian Cup title.

The penalty shoot-outs, instead of replays in the second and third round were introduced because a strike by municipality stadium officials was postponed many first round matches.

First round

|colspan="3" style="background-color:#97DEFF"|28 May 1986

|-
|colspan="3" style="background-color:#97DEFF"|3 June 1986

|-
|colspan="3" style="background-color:#97DEFF"|9 June 1986

|-
|colspan="3" style="background-color:#97DEFF"|10 June 1986

|-
|colspan="3" style="background-color:#97DEFF"|11 June 1986

|-
|colspan="3" style="background-color:#97DEFF"|12 June 1986

|-
|colspan="3" style="background-color:#97DEFF"|Replay: 4 June 1986

|-
|colspan="3" style="background-color:#97DEFF"|Replay: 11 June 1986

|-
|colspan="3" style="background-color:#97DEFF"|Replay: 17 June 1986

|-
|colspan="3" style="background-color:#97DEFF"|Replay: 18 June 1986

|}

Second round

|colspan="3" style="background-color:#97DEFF"|16 June 1986

|-
|colspan="3" style="background-color:#97DEFF"|18 June 1986

|-
|colspan="3" style="background-color:#97DEFF"|23 June 1986

|-
|colspan="3" style="background-color:#97DEFF"|24 June 1986

|-
|colspan="3" style="background-color:#97DEFF"|25 June 1986

|}

Third round

|colspan="3" style="background-color:#97DEFF"|1 July 1986

|-
|colspan="3" style="background-color:#97DEFF"|2 July 1986

|}

Fourth round

|colspan="3" style="background-color:#97DEFF"|30 July 1986

|}

Quarter-finals

|colspan="3" style="background-color:#97DEFF"|27 August 1986

|}

Semi-finals

Final

Tromsø's winning team: Bjarte Flem, (Gunnar Gamst 89), Nils Solstad, Tore Nilsen, Tor H. Pedersen, Trond Steinar Albertsen, Truls Jenssen, Tore Rismo, Sigmund Forfang, Trond Johansen, Per-Mathias Høgmo, (Yngvar Bendiksen 87), 
Lillestrøm's team: Arne Amundsen, Ole Dyrstad, Tor Inge Smedås, Bård Bjerkeland, Gunnar Halle, Rune Richardsen, Kjetil Osvold, Tom Sundby, Bjarne Sognnæs, Sten Glenn Håberg and André Krogsæter.

References
http://www.rsssf.no

Norwegian Football Cup seasons
Norway
Football Cup